Larson may refer to:


People and fictional characters
Larson (surname)

Places in the United States
 Larson, North Dakota, United States, a census-designated place and former city
 Larson Creek, Oregon, United States
 Larson Crag, Victoria Land, Antarctica
 Larson Nunataks, Queen Elizabeth Land, Antarctica
 Larson Valley, Ellsworth Land, Antarctica

Military
 Larson Air Force Base, Moses Lake, Washington, a former United States Air Force base
 USS Everett F. Larson, the name of two United States Navy ships, one proposed but never built

Other uses
 Larson D-1, an agricultural biplane first flown in 1955

See also
 Larson Site, a prehistoric archaeological site in Fulton County, Illinois, United States
 Larsen (disambiguation)
 Larsson
 Larsons Landing